Payamlı can refer to:

 Payamlı, Adıyaman
 Payamlı, Kovancılar